Breda University of Applied Sciences (BUas), formerly NHTV, is a Dutch vocational university in Breda, Netherlands. BUas caters for more than 7,000 Dutch and international students from over 80 countries. The institute offers professional and academic bachelor’s and master’s programmes in the domains of Games, Media, Hotel, Facility, Logistics, Built Environment, Tourism and Leisure & Events. The 5 academies at Breda University of Applied Sciences are Academy for Digital Entertainment (ADE), Academy for Leisure (AfL), Academy for Tourism (AvT), Academy of Hotel and Facility Management (HFM), Academy for Urban Development, and Logistics and Mobility (AUDLM).

History

The history of Breda University of Applied Sciences goes back to 1966, the year in which the Nederlands Wetenschappelijk Instituut voor Toerisme (NWIT) was founded in Breda. This institute primarily focused on tourism, recreation, languages and economics.  
In 1987 the NWIT merged with Verkeersakademie Tilburg (VAT), which was established in 1972. Together they continued as Nationale hogeschool voor toerisme en verkeer (NHTV). In the years that followed, the institute and its course offerings saw substantial growth. The institute adopted an increasingly international outlook, which prompted a new name in 2001: NHTV internationale hogeschool Breda. From this time on, 'NHTV' was no longer an abbreviation, but a brand name.
Since 2009 the institute has also been offering academic degree programmes in the fields of tourism and leisure. That is why its name was changed again, as it was no longer exclusively a higher education institute. The new name was NHTV internationaal hoger onderwijs Breda and in 2018 this name was changed to Breda University of Applied Sciences.

Campus
The campus of Breda University of Applied Sciences (BUas) is located at Mgr. Hopmansstraat 1, 2-4, and 15 in Breda, Netherlands. Between 2016 and 2020 the campus along the Mgr. Hopmansstraat was redesigned and renovated, as well as expanded by the acquisition of the adjacent monastery.

Notable alumni
 Annemarie Jorritsma (born 1950), Dutch politician of the People's Party for Freedom and Democracy and businesswoman.
  (born 1958), Dutch politician of the People's Party for Freedom and Democracy and mayor of Soest, Netherlands.
  (born 1977), Dutch cabaret artist.
 Irena Pantelic (born 1981), Dutch model and Miss Nederland 2001.
  (born 1986), Dutch DJ.

See also 

Education in the Netherlands

References 

Vocational universities in the Netherlands
Education in North Brabant
Buildings and structures in Breda